Presidential elections were held in Iceland on 27 June 2020. Absentee voting opened on 25 May 2020. Incumbent president Guðni Th. Jóhannesson was re-elected with 92% of the vote.

Electoral system
The President of Iceland is elected by first-past-the-post voting, with a simple plurality of votes needed to win.

Candidates
Incumbent president of Iceland Guðni Th. Jóhannesson announced in his new year's address on 1 January 2020 that he would seek re-election.

, a businessman and activist, announced that he would run for the office of president in a Facebook-live video on 22 April.

Several other persons announced their interest in running for the office, including Axel Pétur Axelsson, a self described social engineer, who was quoted as saying that his first matter of business as president would be to dismiss all members of the Icelandic government. Only the incumbent president Guðni Th. Jóhannesson and challenger Guðmundur Franklín Jónsson gathered the required number of signatures to get on the ballot.

Results

References

Iceland
President
Iceland
Presidential elections in Iceland